This is a bibliography of works on World War II.
The bibliography aims to include primary, secondary and tertiary sources regarding the European theatre of World War II (1939–1945) and the Pacific War (1941–1945). By extension, it includes works regarding the Second Sino-Japanese War (1937–1945). Additionally, the scope of the bibliography expands to the causes of World War II and the immediate aftermath of World War II, such as evacuation and expulsion and war crimes trials (such as the Nuremberg Trials and the Tokyo Trials). Works on the causes or the aftermath of World War II should only be included if they describe the respective events in the specific context of and relation to the conflict itself.

There are thousands of books written about World War II; therefore, this is not an all-inclusive list. This bibliography also does not aim to include fictional works (see World War II in popular culture). It does not aim to include self-published works, unless there is a very good reason to do so.

Origins of World War II 
The following lists should include works of secondary literature that are concerned mainly with the origins of World War II in general or with the entry into World War II by one particular country.

Military history, by theater

Global military history

Europe, by theater or front

Asia, by theater or front

Military history, by type of warfare

Aerial warfare 
For general histories of national air forces, check the "specific military branches" section. For development of airplanes and technical histories, check the "science and technology" section.

Aerial warfare by country

Germany

United States

Kamikaze and suicide attacks

Strategic bombing, general

German strategic bombing of the United Kingdom

Western Allied strategic bombing of Germany and German-occupied Europe

Land warfare 
For the history of specific theaters or specific units, see the respective sections.

Airborne warfare and paratroopers

Amphibious warfare and naval infantry 
For histories of the United States Marine Corps, see the respective section under in the specific branches section.

Anti-aircraft warfare 

  — Released in 1955 upon the disbandment of the British Anti-Aircraft Command.

Armored cars

Armored warfare and tank forces

Artillery

Military fortifications

Naval warfare

General

Aircraft carriers

Convoys

Naval battles, Pacific (1941–1945)

Submarine warfare 

 
 
 
  — About the sinking of SS Athenia by U30.

Military history, by national militaries and national military branches

National militaries

Canada

Germany

Poland, whole military

Soviet Union, whole military

United Kingdom, whole military

United States, whole military

Specific military branches

Australia, military branches

Australian Army

Royal Australian Navy

Royal Australian Air Force

Belgium, military branches

Belgian Army

Canada, military branches

Canadian Army

Royal Canadian Air Force

Royal Canadian Navy

France, military branches

French Army

Germany, military branches

German Air Force (Luftwaffe)

German Army (Heer)

Waffen-SS

Japan, military branches

Imperial Japanese Army

Imperial Japanese Navy

New Zealand, military branches

Royal New Zealand Navy

United Kingdom, military branches

British Army

Royal Navy

Royal Air Force

United States, military branches

U.S. Army Air Forces

U.S. Army (without USAAF)

U.S. Marine Corps

U.S. Navy

Military history, by specific military units, formations and warships

Military history, war crimes 
Works that are mainly concerned with war crimes trials and persecution of war criminals after the conclusion of the war should be placed in the appropriate list in the "Aftermath of World War" section.

Allied war crimes

American war crimes

Soviet war crimes

Axis war crimes

Croatian war crimes

German war crimes

Military history, occupation and occupied territories

American occupation 
Occupation after 1945 should be covered in the postwar section.

American occupation of Italy until 1945

British occupation 
Occupation after 1945 should be covered in the postwar section.

British occupation of Italy until 1945

German occupation

German occupation of Belgium

German occupation of Denmark

German occupation of France

German occupation of Italy

German occupation of Norway

German occupation of Poland

German occupation of the Soviet Union

German occupation of Yugoslavia

Japanese occupation

Japanese occupation of the Dutch East Indies (Indonesia)

Military history, other

Colonial troops

United Kingdom, colonial troops 

  — Bechuanaland Protectorate (Botswana) forces
  — Basutoland (Lesotho)
  — Anglo-Egyptian Sudan
  — Bechuanaland Protectorate (Botswana) forces

Grand strategy

Allied grand strategy

Axis grand strategy

Insignia and military symbols

Prisoners of war

Resistance

National and regional histories of World War II 
The following lists should include works focussed mainly on the history of a particular nation, state, or country during World War II. Histories of sovereign states as well as of colonial subjects and of cultural regions are of interest. Histories concerned with a particular theater of war should be placed in military history. For instance, a history of Poland during World War II should be placed in this section, but a history on 1939 invasion should be placed in the respective segment in the military history section.

Africa 
Colonial names should be sorted alphabetically after their colonial name without colonial overlord identifiers. Colonial identifiers should be added with a comma, current countries names should be placed in brackets.

General

Basutoland, British (Lesotho)

Bechuanaland, British (Botswana)

Ethiopia/Abyssinia

North Africa, French (Morocco, Algeria, Tunisia)

Northern Rhodesia, British (Zambia)

South Africa

Asia 
Note that the Middle East has its own section.

China

India, British

Indochina, French (Vietnam, Cambodia, Laos)

Iraq

Japan

Thailand

The Americas

Argentina

Brazil

Canada

Chile

United States

Europe

Austria 
Austria was part of Germany between 1938 and 1945 (see: Anschluss). This section contains books relevant specifically to that segment of the German Reich in the timeframe or to the postwar Republic of Austria in its relationship to World War II.

Belgium

Bulgaria

Croatia

Denmark

Estonia

Finland

France

Germany 
For books specifically about German-owned Austria between 1938 and 1945, see the "Austria" section.

Hungary

Ireland

Italy (Kingdom)

Latvia

Lithuania

Netherlands

Norway

Poland

Portugal

Romania

Soviet Union 

 
 
 
 
 
 
 
 
 
 
 
 
 
 
 
 
 
 
 
 
 
 
 
 
 
 
 
 
 
 
 
 
 
 
 
  – historiography

Spain

Sweden

Switzerland

Turkey

United Kingdom

Yugoslavia

The Middle East

Egypt

Fr. Syria (Syria, Lebanon)

Iran

Palestine

Oceania

Australia

New Zealand

Science and technology

Aircraft development and specific aircraft types

Germany

Japan

United Kingdom

United States

Jet engines

Nuclear technology and atomic weapons

Secondary literature, other

Animals

Art and artists

Italy

Soviet Union

United Kingdom

United States

Biographies and person-focussed works 
The following lists should include works of secondary literature concerned with a singular person that participated in World War II, as well as with the context and content of that service. These books can either be full biographies or be person-focussed studies of the respective subject's wartime service. The subjects of the biography should be listed (preferably wikilinked) after the respective bibliographical entry to ease searching.

Collections of biographies

Military, generals/admirals

France, biographies of generals/admirals 

  — Charles de Gaulle

Germany, biographies of generals/admirals 

  — Wilhelm Canaris
  — Wilhelm Canaris
  — Erich Raeder
  — Wilhelm Canaris
  — Wilhelm Canaris
  — Erwin Rommel
  — Heinz Guderian

Japan, biographies of generals/admirals 

  — Isoroku Yamamoto
  — Matome Ugaki

Soviet Union, biographies of generals/admirals 

  — Georgy Zhukov

United Kingdom, biographies of generals/admirals 

  — Harold Alexander
  — Harold Alexander
 
  — Harold Alexander

United States, biographies of generals/admirals 

  — Dwight D. Eisenhower
  — Dwight D. Eisenhower
  — Dwight D. Eisenhower
  — Dwight D. Eisenhower
  — Claire Chennault
  – Keith Argraves
  — Dwight D. Eisenhower
  — Dwight D. Eisenhower
  — Dwight D. Eisenhower
  — Dwight D. Eisenhower
  — Dwight D. Eisenhower; George S. Patton; Omar Bradley
  — Dwight D. Eisenhower
  — Douglas MacArthur
  — Dwight D. Eisenhower
  — George C. Marshall
  — Dwight D. Eisenhower
  — Dwight D. Eisenhower

Yugoslavia 

  — Draža Mihailović

Military, other

Canada, biographies of military personnel (non-generals/admirals) 

  — Harold Pringle

United Kingdom, biographies of military personnel (non-generals/admirals) 

  — James Harry Lacey
  — Leonard Cheshire
  — Guy Gibson

United States, biographies of military personnel (non-generals/admirals) 

  — Easy Company, 506th Infantry Regiment
  — U.S. Army personnel
  — B24 bomber crews, including George McGovern
  — John F. Kennedy
  — Herman Perry
  — Gene Moore

Politicians, political leaders, monarchs 
This section should be limited to those persons who were politicians and political leaders during World War II. Postwar political leaders should be placed in the sections relevant to their wartime experience.

Australia, biographies of political figures 

  — John Curtin

Belgium, biographies of political figures 

  — Leopold III of Belgium
  — Leopold III of Belgium

France, biographies of political figures 

  — Charles de Gaulle

Germany, biographies of political figures 

  — Adolf Hitler
  — Reinhard Heydrich
  — Adolf Hitler
  — Adolf Hitler
  — Adolf Hitler
  — Adolf Hitler
  — Heinrich Himmler
  — Joseph Goebbels
  — Martin Bormann
  — Albert Speer
  — Martin Bormann

Soviet Union, biographies of political figures 

  — Lavrentiy Beria
  — Joseph Stalin

United Kingdom, biographies of political figures 

  — Winston Churchill
  — Winston Churchill

United States, biographies of political figures 

  — Franklin D. Roosevelt; Henry Morgenthau Jr.
  — Harry S. Truman

Scientists

United States, biographies of scientists

Writers and poets

Soviet Union, biographies of writers/poets 

  — Vasily Grossman

Victims of genocide or ethnoracial persecution/oppression

Holocaust 

  — Herschel Grynszpan

Japanese Americans 

  — victims of the internment of Japanese Americans

Porajmos 

  — survivors of Lety concentration camp

Victims of warfare

Japan 

  — Sadako Sasaki

Diplomatic history 
The following lists should include works of secondary literature that are concerned mainly with diplomacy and foreign affairs during as well as immediately before and after World War II.

General

Allied diplomacy

Allied conferences

Atlantic Conference (Atlantic Charter, 9–12 August 1941)

Casablanca Conference (14–24 January 1943)

Yalta Conference (4–11 February 1945)

Axis diplomacy

German-Soviet cooperation, 1939–1941

Neutral diplomacy

Economic history, resource production, agriculture

General

Agriculture

Economic history by country

Australia

United States

Lend-lease deliveries 
See also the literature on convoy warfare in the naval military history section.

Natural resources

Intelligence and espionage 
The following lists should include works of secondary literature that are concerned mainly with spies, espionage, covert operations, intelligence agencies and secret services during World War II.

General

Allied intelligence services

Allied military deception operations

Axis intelligence services

Literature and fiction

Official histories 
The following list should include official histories issued by governments and state actors after World War II.

Footnotes

Mass media

Women's history 
Biographies of individual women are to be found in the biographies section.

Sexual assault and rape during World War II

Women in combat roles during World War II

Women's history, by country

Australia

Soviet Union

United Kingdom

United States

Aftermath of World War II 
The following lists should include works of secondary literature concerned with the immediate and short-term aftermath of World War II, giving strong priority to such works that describe said events in specific relation and reference to World War II.

General

Establishment of the Eastern bloc

Expulsion and refugee movements

Fugitive war criminals

Liberated territories

Postwar occupation

Germany

Japan

War crimes trials

Germany

Japan

Direct accounts and primary literature

Diaries, letter collections, transcripts of private conversations 
The following lists should include diaries or letter collections written (at least partially) during World War II. The list should be focussed on works that were written during the war for either personal or restricted private consumption, and without authorial intent for widespread publication.

Civilians

Belgium, civilian diaries

Germany, civilian diaries 

  — Initially published anonymously; deals intensively with the rape of German women by Soviet troops.

Netherlands, civilian diaries

United Kingdom, civilian diaries

United States, civilian diaries

Military

Australia, military diaries

Canada, military diaries

Germany, military diaries

United Kingdom, military diaries

United States, military diaries

Politicians, political leaders, diplomats

Canada, politician diaries

France, politician diaries

Germany, politician diaries

Italy, politician diaries

Soviet Union, politician diaries

Memoirs and autobiographies

Study aides and tertiary literature

Atlases 

 
 
 
 
 
  – 7 volumes are viewable at archive.org

Encyclopedias, dictionaries, and lexicons 
The following list should include encyclopedias of World War II, i.e. reference works or compendiums containing multiple short entries that are sorted alphabetically.

Source collections 
The following list should include source collections, i.e. collections of primary documents or accounts about or in reference to World War II.

Bibliographies 
This list should include bibliographies, i.e. listings of books, about World War II.

See also 

 Bibliography of Eisenhower, Dwight D.
 Bibliography of Hitler, Adolf
 Bibliography of the Holocaust
 Bibliography of the Holocaust in Greece
 Bibliography of Nazi Germany
 Bibliography of Poland during World War II
 Bibliography of Roosevelt, Franklin D.
 Bibliography of Roosevelt, Eleanor
 Bibliography of the Soviet Union during World War II
 Bibliography of Stalinism and the Soviet Union
 Bibliography of Truman, Harry S.

!World War II